The Alhambra is a palace in Granada, Spain. Al-Ḥamrāʾ means "the red one" in Arabic.

Alhambra may also refer to:

Places

United States
Alhambra, Missouri, a ghost town in Stoddard County
Alhambra, Phoenix, an urban village in Phoenix, Arizona
Alhambra, California, a city in Los Angeles County
Alhambra, Illinois, a village in Madison County
Alhambra, Louisiana, an unincorporated community
Alhambra, Montana, a community in Jefferson County

Other places
Alhambra, Alberta, in Canada
Alhambra, Ciudad Real, a municipality in Ciudad Real, Castile-La Mancha, Spain

Theatres

Europe
Alhambra-Maurice Chevalier, a music hall in Paris (1866–1967)
Alhambra (Paris), music hall in Paris, opened 2008
Alhambra Theatre, London
Alhambra, Blackpool, an entertainment complex in Blackpool, Lancashire, England, from 1899 to 1903
Alhambra Copenhagen (1855–1870), a large entertainment-complex, built in 1857 in Copenhagen, Denmark
Alhambra Theatre Glasgow, opened on 19 December 1910  
Alhambra Theatre, Manchester, in Higher Openshaw, Manchester, England, was opened in 1910
Bradford Alhambra, West Yorkshire, England
Alhambra Theatre, Dunfermline, Scotland, opened in 1922

North America
Alhambra Theatre (El Paso, Texas), opened 1914 
Alhambra Theatorium, Evansville, Indiana
The Harlem Alhambra, Manhattan, New York
Alhambra Dinner Theatre, Jacksonville, Florida
Alhambra Arena, sporting venue, Philadelphia
Alhambra Theatre (Sacramento), California
Alhambra Theatre (San Francisco), California

Other theatres
Alhambra Cinema (Israel), an Art Deco building in Jaffa, Tel Aviv, Israel

Entertainment
 Alhambra (EP), a 1996 EP by The Tea Party
 Alhambra (board game), a popular German board game
 Alhambra (video game), the Xbox Live Arcade version of the aforementioned board game

People
Miirrha Alhambra (1890–1957), stage name of the French-born pianist Pauline Joutard
Alhambra Nievas (born 1983), former Spain women's rugby union international and a current rugby union referee

Other uses 
Alhambra (1855), a British ship wrecked in 1888
Alhambra (solitaire), a card game
Alhambra Decree, a royal decree issued in 1492 ordering the expulsion or conversion of all the Jews in Spain
Alhambra International Guitar Competition, a classical guitar competition founded by Alhambra Guitarras
Alhambra Publishing, a Swedish publishing house
Alhambra Shopping Centre in Barnsley, England
Cervezas Alhambra, a Spanish brand of beer
SEAT Alhambra, a multi-purpose vehicle made by Spanish car maker SEAT
The Alhambra, original title of the book Tales of the Alhambra by Washington Irving
Order of Alhambra, a Catholic fraternal order
Alhambra, a former folly by William Chambers that stood in Kew Gardens, London

See also
Alhambra High School (disambiguation)
Hamra (disambiguation)
Memories of the Alhambra, a South Korean TV series which aired in 2018
Recuerdos de la Alhambra, a classical guitar piece Francisco Tárrega